The Sydney Ghost Train fire at Luna Park Sydney in Milsons Point, New South Wales, Australia, killed seven people, six children and one adult, on 9 June 1979. Inadequate fire-fighting measures and low staffing caused the fire to completely destroy the amusement park's ghost train. The ride is believed to have been first constructed in 1931 and transported between Milsons Point and Glenelg, South Australia, during 1934 and 1935.

The fire was originally blamed on electrical faults, but arson by known figures has also been claimed. The exact cause of the fire could not be determined by a coronial inquiry. The coroner also ruled that, while the actions of Luna Park's management and staff before and during the fire (in particular their choosing not to follow advice on the installation of a sprinkler system in the ride) breached their duty of care, charges of criminal negligence should not be laid. The case was reopened in 1987: no new findings were made, although the police investigation and coronial inquiry were criticised. The fire forced the closure of Luna Park until 1982, when it reopened under a new name and new owners. 

A memorial garden was installed by Luna Park in 1995, but its fixtures were lost during the park's 2003 redevelopment. In replacement, a plaque listing those killed was placed at the location of the ride, but a promised mural to surround the plaque was never painted. A separate memorial park was created by North Sydney Council in 2007, including a sculpture by Michael Leunig.

Ride

Luna Park Sydney's Ghost Train was a ghost train-style amusement ride. Designed and constructed in 1931 at Luna Park Glenelg, the ride was transported to Milsons Point, New South Wales, along with all the other rides and reassembled prior to Luna Park Sydney's first opening in October 1935. 

The ride was one of the most popular in the park and featured many twists and turns that yanked passengers along a 180-metre electric track, with cobwebs hanging and scary figures leaping out at riders. The ride featured a fake fireplace, which according to riders of the night it burned down, was where the destructive fire originated. This fireplace was found in a caged area, which riders would enter before re-entering the ride.

The ride was lined with exhibits meant to scare riders, like the dancing skeletons, an ape monster, a dragon's head, the graveyard Dracula, and a skeleton in a box. The ride's soundtrack said, "there are lots of ghosts in here, you'll shiver and quake in the Ghost Train"! Most of the 2 min 30-sec ride was pitch black, something which helped conceal the ride's age.

Architectural plans and drawings of rides and buildings at Luna Park Sydney are held at the State Library of New South Wales, including the Ghost Train ride. The plans and drawings include some from Luna Park Glenelg (Glenelg, South Australia) and Luna Park Melbourne (St Kilda, Victoria).

Fire
On the night of 9 June 1979, a fire broke out inside the Luna Park Ghost Train at approximately 10:15 pm. Due to a combination of low water pressure, under-staffing within the park, and inadequate coverage of the Ghost Train by the park's fire hose system, the fire was able to completely consume the ride. It took an hour to bring the fire under control, but it was extinguished before any significant damage could be done to the adjacent River Caves and Big Dipper.

Around thirty-five people were believed to have been on the ride when thick smoke began to escape from the tunnel doors. Ride staff raised the alarm and began to pull people from the ride as their cars exited the tunnel. It was initially thought that everybody had escaped the fire, but at around 11:30 pm, the bodies of seven people were found inside the ride: John Godson and his two children, Damien and Craig, and four Waverley College students; Jonathan Billings, Richard Carroll, Michael Johnson, and Seamus Rahilly. At the time of the fire, investigating police speculated that the seven had climbed out of their cars and unsuccessfully tried to find their way out of the tunnel; had they stayed in the cars, they might have survived. Other evacuated passengers reported seeing empty cars exit the tunnel on fire.

Investigation
Luna Park was shut down immediately after the incident for a federal investigation. A coronial inquiry into the incident did not determine the cause of the fire, although it was demonstrated that the ride's permanent wiring and attractions were not the source of ignition. Coroner Kevin Anderson found that Luna Park's management had failed to develop an adequate fire suppression program, despite recommendations by North Sydney Council and the Fire Department eighteen months earlier. Anderson's report stated that while the park's owners and management had failed in their duty of care towards patrons, the failure was not "that high degree of negligence necessary to support a charge of criminal negligence". The Government of New South Wales called for new tenders to operate the park on 31 July 1979.

Before the fire, a Sydney design consultant stated that he had advised Luna Park management to install a sprinkler system in the Ghost Train in December 1977, following an inspection of the park for potential renovations. The recommendation was not followed.

In 1987, a Government inquiry by the National Crime Authority reopened the investigation of the fire. No new evidence was presented, but it was found that the police investigation into the incident had been inadequate, and the coronial inquiry ineffective.

Despite claims ranging from faulty wiring to sabotage in an attempt to have the park closed down and demolished, the cause of the fire has never been established.

Links to Abe Saffron

In May 2007, Anne Buckingham, a niece of Sydney underworld figure Abe Saffron, claimed in an interview with the Sydney Morning Herald that her uncle was responsible for the fire. Saffron had been associated with seven other arson attacks in the two years following the Ghost Train fire, although he had repeatedly denied involvement with the Ghost Train fire. Buckingham claimed the attack was part of a plan for Saffron to gain control of Luna Park's lease, although she stated her belief that the seven deaths were not intended.

Former Park Artist Martin Sharp claimed that Saffron had approached Luna Park's owner, Ted Hopkins, several years before the fire, offering to buy the park. In 1985, it was claimed by NSW MP Michael John Hatton that Saffron had beneficial ownership of the park, resulting in an inquiry which concluded that although people related to Saffron were involved in supplying pinball and arcade games to Luna Park, Saffron himself was not linked to the ownership of the park.

Buckingham later denied she made the comments attributed to her and demanded the story not be published, although the Herald claims her original statements were recorded on tape during a face-to-face interview. The NSW Attorney General has stated the coronial inquiry could be reopened, but would first require the submission of new evidence to the police.

Memorial
A memorial was dedicated in 1995 to the seven victims of the 1979 fire, with a tree planted next to an antique bench decorated with the names of the victims. During the 2003 redevelopment, the tree was removed and the bench lost. Park director Warwick Doughty claimed that the memorial and events had little relevance, although North Sydney mayor Genia McCaffery, among others, disagreed and campaigned for the memorial's reinstatement. In 2004, a plaque listing the names of the victims was placed on an external wall of the Big Top Sydney, which was constructed on the site of the Ghost Train. The plaque was to be the centrepiece of a mural painted by Sharp, but this has never been painted. At least one person present at the unveiling of the plaque was unimpressed with the new memorial.

A memorial park was opened at Lavender Bay by North Sydney Council on 25 August 2007. The Art Barton Park, named after former Park Artist Arthur Barton, includes a bronze sculpture designed by Michael Leunig dedicated to the victims.

The Chapel at Waverley College features a memorial to four of the boys who perished in the fire. The memorial features a photo of each boy along with their names on a plaque.

Exposed: The Ghost Train Fire
In March 2021,  Australia's national broadcaster, the Australian Broadcasting Corporation (ABC), screened a three-part investigative series by journalist Caro Meldrum-Hanna, Exposed: The Ghost Train Fire. The series investigated potential evidence around the fire and the personalities involved, interviewing all surviving family of the fire's victims, along with many judicial figures and police investigators of the time, and alleged witnesses and some former park staff. The investigation also brought to light much of Sharp's evidence from his archive of files and tapes on the case. The investigation concluded that a web of criminality extending between Saffron, former NSW Premier Neville Wran, former High Court Justice Lionel Murphy and organised crime boss Jack Rooklyn was responsible for the fire, with Saffron allegedly ordering the lighting of the fire which was carried out by a group of 'bikies', so Saffron could gain control of the lease on the 'crown land' (land protected by the state government) on which Luna Park stood. The program suggested that a new coronial inquiry or Royal Commission into the case should be opened, with all the new evidence taken into account.

See also
List of disasters in Australia by death toll

References

Fires in Australia
1979 fires in Oceania
1979 in Australia
Amusement park accidents
Disasters in Sydney
1970s in Sydney